Ager is an Anglo Saxon and Danish surname, and it derived from the given name Agar. Notable people with the surname include:

Andrew Ager (born 1962), Canadian composer
Cecelia Ager (1902–1981), American film critic
Christina Ager (born 1995), Austrian Alpine skier
Deborah Ager, American poet
John Ager (born 1949), American politician
Klaus Ager (born 1946), Austrian composer and conductor
Maurice Ager (born 1984), American basketball player
Maria Ager, Austrian chess master
Milton Ager (1893–1979), American pianist and composer
Nikolaus Ager (1568–1634), French botanist born in Alsace
Simon Ager (born 1970), British linguist and author of the online encyclopaedia Omniglot
Waldemar Ager (1869–1941), Norwegian-American newspaperman and author

Fictional characters
Captain Ager and Lady Ager, characters in the 1617 play A Fair Quarrel
William Ager, chief antagonist in M R James' 1925 ghost story A Warning to the Curious

See also
Wendy Ager-Grant (born 1953), British fencer
Christen Ager-Hanssen (born 1962), Norwegian Internet entrepreneur & venture capitalist